Fruit bromelain (juice bromelain, ananase, Bromelase (a trademark), bromelin, extranase, pinase, pineapple enzyme, traumanase, fruit bromelain FA2) is an enzyme. This enzyme catalyses the following chemical reaction

 Hydrolysis of proteins with broad specificity for peptide bonds. Bz-Phe-Val-Arg-NHMec is a good synthetic substrate

This enzyme is isolated from pineapple plant, Ananas comosus.

See also 
 Bromelain

References

External links 
 

EC 3.4.22